Imagineering, based in Glen Rock, New Jersey, was an American in-house studio of Absolute Entertainment. Many notable video games developed for Absolute include A Boy and His Blob: Trouble on Blobolonia, Battle Tank, Super Battletank and The Rescue of Princess Blobette. They are also best known for their video games developed for third-party publishers, such as Acclaim Entertainment, Atari Corporation, Activision, Hi Tech Expressions, Gametek and THQ.

Imagineering was in existence from 1986 to 1992 before folding into Absolute Entertainment who then handled simultaneously the development and publishing of video games for its remaining three years.

Lineup of games

1988
 Commando (Atari 2600)
 Crossbow (Commodore 64)
 Double Dragon (Atari 2600, Atari 7800)
 River Raid II (Atari 2600)

1989
 Ikari Warriors (Atari 2600, Atari 7800)
 Stealth ATF (NES)
 Touchdown Football (Atari 7800)
 Fight Night (Atari 7800)

1990
 Sentinel (Atari 2600, Atari 7800)
 Destination Earthstar (NES)
 A Boy and His Blob: Trouble on Blobolonia (NES)
 Ghostbusters II (NES)
 My Golf (Atari 2600)
 Heavy Shreddin' (NES)

1991
 Attack of the Killer Tomatoes (NES)
 The Simpsons: Bart vs. the Space Mutants (NES)
 The Simpsons: Bart vs. the World (NES)
 Bart Simpson's Escape from Camp Deadly (Game Boy)
 Family Feud (SNES)
 Flight of the Intruder (NES)
 Jeopardy! Featuring Alex Trebek (SNES)
 Home Alone (SNES, Game Boy)
 Barbie (NES)

1992
 The Adventures of Rocky and Bullwinkle and Friends (Game Boy)
 The Simpsons: Bart vs. The Juggernauts (Game Boy)
 The Simpsons: Bartman Meets Radioactive Man (NES)
 Home Alone 2: Lost in New York (NES, SNES, Game Boy)
 Swamp Thing (NES)
 Mouse Trap Hotel (Game Boy)
 Ghoul School (NES)
 Barbie: Game Girl (Game Boy)
 The Ren & Stimpy Show: Space Cadet Adventures (Game Boy)
 Jordan vs. Bird: One on One (Game Boy)
 Race Drivin' (SNES)

1993
 The Adventures of Rocky and Bullwinkle and Friends (SNES)
 The Ren & Stimpy Show: Buckaroo$! (NES)

External links

Imagineering profile on GameFAQs

Companies based in Bergen County, New Jersey
Video game companies established in 1986
Video game companies disestablished in 1992
Defunct companies based in New Jersey
Defunct video game companies of the United States
Video game development companies
1986 establishments in New Jersey
American companies established in 1986
American companies disestablished in 1992